Khalaf Ahmad Al Habtoor Foundation is a UAE-based charitable organization, launched in January 2013 by Khalaf Al Habtoor, Chairman of the Al Habtoor Group.

The headquarters of the group are at the Al Farooq Omar Bin Al Khattab Mosque and Centre, Al Safa, Jumeirah.

Campaigns
In 2016, the Foundation initiated its Ramadan campaign in Lebanon. The first stage of the program resulted in the foundation delivering 5,100 food packages to families in need across the country. Beneficiaries of their support included the Al Hrar Hospital. Additionally, they distributed food across the country, but also to the Lebanese Arab Crescent. 

In 2014 the Foundation has launched campaigns to provide humanitarian aid to support Syrian Refugees in Lebanon   and support Palestine Refugees in Lebanon. The Foundation also provided assistance to Lebanese Families & Syrian refugees in Lebanon. In 2013 the Foundation assisted Christian Syrian families in Lebanon   and distributed 14,000 portions of aid for Syrian refugees in Lebanon.

Other initiatives include
Launch of the Jurisprudence Abstract under the Auspices of the Khalaf Ahmad Al Habtoor Foundation 
Support for the Khalaf Ahmad Al Habtoor Award for Qur'an & Sunnah 2014 
Distribution Ramadan Food Parcels in 2014 
Funding for the extension of the Al Shura Mosque in Jordan 
Support for the launch of the Encyclopedia of the Mosques of the United Arab Emirates

References

External links 
The Launch of the Khalaf Ahmad Al Habtoor Foundation, published on Jan 21, 2013.
Gulf News, published on January 21, 2013.
Aljoumhouria, published on July 1, 2014.
Al Khaleej Online Newspaper, published on June 20, 2014.
Almustaqbal, published on June 19, 2014.
Almustaqbal, published on June 15, 2014.
Al Bayan, published on July 15, 2014.
Almustaqbal, published on June 17, 2014.

2013 establishments in the United Arab Emirates
Charities based in the United Arab Emirates
Organisations based in Dubai